Konjam Konjam is an Indian Tamil-language romantic family drama film written and directed by debutant Uday Sankar and starring Priya Mohan, Gokul Krishnan, and Mersheena Neenu in prominent roles. Produced by Betty C.K and P.R.Mohan under their Mimosa Productions company. Production for the film began during January of 2016. The film was released on 22 September 2017.

Cast 
 Gokul Krishna as Thirunavukarasu
 Priya Mohan as Thilakavathi
 Mersheena Neenu  as Divya
 Appukutty as Shiva Balan
 Mansoor Ali Khan as Kodumudi Babu
 Vinodhini as Kodumudi Babu's Wife
 Jangiri Madhumitha
 A.K.Thavassi as Sudaly
 Shivadhanu as Senthamilan
 Pradeep Kottayam as Broono
 Jayan Cherthala as S.I Jaya Kumar
 Sharmila Thapa as Thapa
 Shanthi Mani as Parvathy
 Rajini Murali as Rajini Teacher
 Mahalakshmi as Thamarai
 Gayathri as Radha

References

External links
 

2017 films
2010s Tamil-language films
Films about firefighting
Films scored by Sean Roldan
Indian romantic drama films
2017 directorial debut films